Arnold Rinatovich Slabodich (born 31 August 1973) is a Russian professional football coach and a former player. He is an assistant coach for FC Pari Nizhny Novgorod.

Club career
He made his Russian Premier League debut for FC KAMAZ Naberezhnye Chelny on 16 April 1994 in a game against FC Lokomotiv Nizhny Novgorod. He also played in the top tier in 1995.

External links
 

1973 births
Footballers from Ufa
Living people
Soviet footballers
Russian footballers
Association football forwards
Russian Premier League players
FC Neftyanik Ufa players
FC KAMAZ Naberezhnye Chelny players
FC Ural Yekaterinburg players
FC Neftekhimik Nizhnekamsk players
FC Torpedo Vladimir players